Ernesto Korrodi (Zürich, 31 January 1870 – Leiria, 3 February 1944), was a Swiss-born architect who moved to Portugal aged 19, spending the remainder of his life there.

He later adopted Portuguese citizenship, and married a Portuguese woman. He died in 1944.

Main works
He has more than 400 works in all Portugal of which the most important are:
 Castle of D. Chica
 Hotel Guadiana in the town of Vila Real de Santo António, the oldest Hotel in the Algarve.
 Restoration of Leiria Castle
 Church of Santa Catarina da Serra, Leiria (1902)

External links
 

20th-century Portuguese architects
1870 births
1944 deaths